Columbia is a rural locality in the Charters Towers Region, Queensland, Australia. In the  Columbia had a population of 101 people.

Geography 
Charters Towers Airport occupies the west of the locality.There are two airstrips. There is no control tower but there is pilot-activated lighting available. The second airstrip is unsealed. Refuelling facilities are available.

Charters Towers racecourse is in the south of the locality and is accessed from Hackett Terrace.

History 
Dalrymple Trade Training Centre was officially opened on 13 April 2014 by Senator Ian Macdonald.

In the  Columbia had a population of 101 people.

Heritage listings 

Charters Towers has a number of heritage-listed sites, including:
 at Charters Towers Airport: Bore Sight Range and Compass Swinging Platform

Education 
Dalrymple Trade Training Centre is a secondary (10-12) education unit at 1-13 Macpherson Street. It operates in conjunction with secondary schools in the Charters Towers area to provide vocational training in purpose-built, fully-equipped, modern premises.

References

Suburbs of Charters Towers
Localities in Queensland